Yaroslav Khartsyz (born 7 May 1997) is a Ukrainian boxer. He competed in the men's lightweight event at the 2020 Summer Olympics.

References

External links
 

1997 births
Living people
Ukrainian male boxers
Olympic boxers of Ukraine
Boxers at the 2020 Summer Olympics
Place of birth missing (living people)
European Games competitors for Ukraine
Boxers at the 2019 European Games
21st-century Ukrainian people